Willis (also Macktown) is an unincorporated community in Russell County, Virginia, United States.  Its elevation is 2,215 feet (675 m).

References

Unincorporated communities in Russell County, Virginia
Unincorporated communities in Virginia